Francisco de la Cueva y Silva (Born Medina del Campo, 1550 - Died Madrid, 1621), dramatist, philologist and Spanish lawyer of the Golden Age, he was also the uncle of the playwright Leonor de la Cueva y Silva.

Spanish male writers
1550 births
1621 deaths
Place of birth missing